Alan, Allen or Allan Andrews may refer to:

 Allan Andrews (Australian politician) (born 1940), member for Heathcote from 1988 to 1991
Alan Andrews, in 1985 Pittsburgh Steelers season
Alan Andrews, on List of science fiction films of the 2010s
Alan Andrews (musician) in The Photo Atlas
Allen Andrews (author)

See also